WEGC (107.7 FM,  "107.7 Now FM") is a radio station serving Albany, Georgia and surrounding cities with a hot adult contemporary format. This station is under ownership of Rick Lambert and Bob Spencer, through licensee First Media Services, LLC.  Its studios are on Broad Avenue just west of downtown Albany, and the transmitter is located west of Albany.

History
On April 30, 2020, Cumulus Media sold its entire Albany cluster for First Media Services for $450,000. The sale was consummated on December 15, 2020.

On March 17, 2023, at 1:07 p.m., WEGC changed formats from adult contemporary to hot adult contemporary, branded as "107.7 Now FM".

References

External links
107.7 Now FM - Official Website

Hot adult contemporary radio stations in the United States
Radio stations established in 1982
EGC
1982 establishments in Georgia (U.S. state)